Heather L. Pringle is a United States Air Force major general serving as the commander of the Air Force Research Laboratory. Previously, she was the director of strategic plans of the U.S. Air Force.

References

External links

Year of birth missing (living people)
Living people
Place of birth missing (living people)
United States Air Force generals